The Old Pompano Fire Station, located at 219 NE 4th Avenue, Pompano Beach, Florida, is a museum operated by the Pompano Beach Historical Society. It is housed in the city's first fire station, and contains two antique fire engines, together with photographs and artifacts relating to the history of firefighting in Pompano Beach.

Museums in Pompano Beach, Florida
Defunct fire stations in Florida
Pompano Beach, Florida
Firefighting museums in the United States
Buildings and structures in Pompano Beach, Florida
Historical society museums in Florida
Firefighting in Florida